Jason Scott Bevan (18 April 1978 – 7 October 2017) was an Australian rules footballer who played with Collingwood in the Australian Football League (AFL).

Bevan was a midfielder, who Collingwood secured in the 1995 AFL Draft. His two appearances in the 1996 AFL season where in Collingwood's round 15 win over eventual premiers North Melbourne and their win against Fitzroy the following round.

References

External links
 
 

1978 births
2017 deaths
Australian rules footballers from South Australia
Collingwood Football Club players
South Adelaide Football Club players